Werther is an opera by Jules Massenet.

Werther may also refer to:

Places
Werther, North Rhine-Westphalia, a town in western Germany
Werther, Thuringia, a municipality in eastern Germany

People with the surname
Gustav Werther (1815–1869), German chemist
Heinrich Wilhelm von Werther (1772–1859), Prussian diplomat and politician

Arts
The Sorrows of Young Werther, a novel by Johann Wolfgang von Goethe that the opera Werther is loosely based on
Werther (1986 film), a Spanish film based on the novel
Werther (1927 film), a Czech film

Others
Werther's Original, a toffee-and-cream candy
 The New Werther, by the statistician Karl Pearson